The Blitta Solar Power Station is an operational  solar power plant in Togo. The power station was developed by Amea Power, an independent power producer (IPP), based in the United Arab Emirates. The solar farm, which is the largest grid-ready in Togo, is also referred to as Mohamed Bin Zayed Power Station, named after His Highness Sheikh Mohamed bin Zayed Al Nahyan, the Crown Prince of Abu Dhabi. The power station began commercial operations in June 2021.

Location

Overview
The power station's installed capacity is 50 megawatts. Its output is sold directly to the government of Togo for integration into the national electricity grid, under a 25-year power purchase agreement. The solar park will be operated and maintained by Amea Togo Solar, the local subsidiary of Amea Power, the UAE-based IPP that owns the power station. It is expected that the power station will provide electricity to 600,000 homes and 700 small and medium-sized enterprises, in Togo.

Developers
The power station was developed by Amea Power, an independent power producer based in the United Arab Emirates. The solar park is operated by Amea Togo Solar, the local subsidiary of the Middle Eastern owners.

Funding and timeline

The table below outlines the sources of funding for the construction of this power station.

Construction began in February 2020. Commercial commissioning took place in June 2021.

Expansion
In November 2022, AMEA Power Company, the Dubai-based IPP, secured a US$25 million loan for the purpose of increasing capacity of the power station from 50 MW to 70 MW. In addition a battery storage facility, rated at 4 MWh will be added to the installation, to facilitate power supply after sunset. The EPC contractor for the expansion and energy storage installation is Amea Power's subsidiary, Amea Technical Services. The loan was provided  by the Abu Dhabi Export Office (ADEX), a "financial facility of the Abu Dhabi Fund for Development (ADFD)".

Other considerations
When fully developed, the 70 MW power station with the energy storage attachment, will become the largest solar power plant in West Africa. At that time it is calculated that the solar farm will meet the electricity needs of "at east 222,000 Togolese households".

See also

List of power stations in Togo
Kpalassi Solar Power Station
Oyem Solar Power Station

References

External links
 Works at the Blitta solar power project completed As of 22 March 2021.

Solar power stations in Togo
Centrale Region, Togo
2021 establishments in Togo
Energy infrastructure completed in 2021